Michael Steinlechner (born 27 April 1987) is an Austrian footballer who plays for SV Fügen.

References

External links
 
 
 Michael Steinlechner at ÖFB

Austrian footballers
Austrian Football Bundesliga players
2. Liga (Austria) players
Austrian Regionalliga players
1987 births
Living people
FC Wacker Innsbruck (2002) players
WSG Tirol players
Association football defenders
People from Schwaz
Footballers from Tyrol (state)